Faces & Places is a jazz album by Joe Zawinul, released in 2002 on ESC Records.

Track listing 
 "The Search" (Zawinul)
 "All About Simon" (Zawinul, Mbappe)
 "Introduction to Tower of Silence" (Zawinul, Chatterjee)
 "Tower of Silence" (Zawinul)
 "The Spirit of Julian "C" Adderley" (Zawinul)
 "Familiar to Me" (Zawinul, Lang, Page)
 "Café Andalusia" (A Day in Tunisia)
 "Good Day" (Zawinul)
 "Barefoot Beauty" (Zawinul)
 "Rooftops of Vienna" (Zawinul)
 "Borges Buenos Aires, Pt. 1" (Zawinul)
 "Borges Buenos Aires, Pt. 2" (Zawinul)
 "Siseya" (Zawinul, Mbappe)
 "East 12th Street Band" (Zawinul)

Personnel 
Joe Zawinul - spoken vocals, keyboards, synthesizer
Harry Kim - trumpet, flugelhorn
Bobby Malach - tenor saxophone, winds
Lori Perry
Dean Brown - guitar
Richard Page - vocals
Maria João - vocals 
Amit Chatterjee - vocals, guitar
Zakir Hussain - tablas 
Manolo Badrena - percussion
Alex Acuña - percussion
Nathaniel Townsley - drums
Etienne Mbappe - bass
Richard Bona - bass
Les Benedict - trombone (erroneously listed as "Lester")

References 

Joe Zawinul albums
2002 albums